Maggie Thrett (born Diane Pine; November 18, 1946 – December 18, 2022) was an American actress and singer.

Biography
At age 15, she made her off-Broadway debut in 1962 in Out Brief Candle. By the age of 18, she was regularly performing as a dancer at Trude Heller's in Greenwich Village, New York, as observed in the January 1965 edition of Harper's Bazaar.

As a vocalist, Thrett recorded a single (under her birth name) entitled "Lucky Girl" for Take 3 Records in 1964, and had a minor US hit (as Maggie Thrett) in 1965 with "Soupy", produced by Bob Crewe and issued on the DynoVoice (formerly Dyno-Vox) label. Billboard journalist Aaron Sternfield, reviewing a live performance at Basin Street East, New York, on July 15, 1965, wrote that she "has a magnificent range, her phrasing and timing are near perfect, and she blends the right combination of sex and satire."

In 1966, Thrett went to Hollywood to further her acting career. As an actress, she had roles in a Star Trek episode ("Mudd's Women", 1966) and the comedy movie Three in the Attic (1968). She also appeared as a prostitute in the movie Cover Me Babe (1970). Having signed to Universal Studios, she is reported to have used her life savings to buy out her contract prior to appearing in Three in the Attic for American International Pictures.

In May 1970, Thrett was involved in a road accident while a passenger on singer-songwriter Gram Parsons' motorcycle. Although she was apparently unharmed (Parsons, meanwhile, suffered significant injuries), soon after this, she disappeared from the entertainment business, having reportedly tired of continual auditioning and producers' unwanted advances.

Personal life and death
Within two years of leaving Hollywood, Thrett had met and married her husband, Alex, with whom she had three children. 

Thrett was later married to Canadian actor Donnelly Rhodes from 1975 to 1977.

Thrett died in Long Island, New York, on December 18, 2022, at the age of 76.

Discography
 "Lucky Girl" / "Your Love is Mine"  (Take 3 709, 1964)
 "Soupy" / "Put a Little Time Away" (DynoVoice 205, 1965)
 "Soupy" / "Put a Little Time Away" (Barry B-3347, 1965) (Canadian release)

A further DynoVoice single, "Walk On By", is referenced in Aaron Sternfield's Billboard review of Thrett's July 1965 Basin Street East performance. However, no evidence of this single's release is in the DynoVoice singles catalog, nor does any other source appear to corroborate its existence.

Filmography
 Dimension 5 as second Sister (1966 movie)
 Out of Sight as Wipe Out (1966 movie)
 Run for Your Life as Brenda in The Night of the Terror (1966 TV episode)
 Star Trek as Ruth Bonaventure in "Mudd's Women" (1966 TV episode)
 The Wild Wild West as Rita Leon in "The Night of the Freebooters" (1966 TV episode)
 I Love a Mystery (1967 TV movie, aired 1973)
 Dundee and the Culhane as Wimea in "The Death of a Warrior Brief" (1967 TV episode)
 The Wild Wild West as Deirdre (Topaz) in "The Night of the Running Death" (1967 TV episode)
 The Devil's Brigade as Millie (1968 movie)
 Three in the Attic as Jan (1968 movie)
 Cimarron Strip as Red Deer in "Heller" (1968 TV episode)
 I Dream of Jeannie as Joan in Never Put a Genie on a Budget (1969 TV episode)
 Lost Flight as second Girl (1969 TV movie)
 Cover Me Babe as Prostitute (1970 movie)
 McCloud as Godiva in "Manhattan Manhunt Part 1: Horse Stealing on Fifth Avenue" (1970 TV episode)
 The Most Deadly Game as Lisa in "Model for Murder" (1970 TV episode)

References

External links
 Maggie Thrett, Sixties Cinema
 
 
 Entry at 45cat.com as Diane Pine
 Entry at 45cat.com as Maggie Thrett

1946 births
2022 deaths
21st-century American women
Actresses from New York City
American film actresses
American television actresses